Asaph is the second studio album from Loud Harp. They released the album on April 8, 2014.

Critical reception

Awarding the album four and a half stars from Worship Leader, Jeremy Armstrong states, "Asaph is the freshest sound in the worship landscape." Jessica Cooper, giving the album five stars at Indie Vision Music, writes, "It’s loaded with good vibes, good sounds, good lyrics, and good…ness. It's just good." Reviewing the album for Ruminate Magazine, Chris Hess describes, "Landscapes and textures of focused, swaying, creative, joyful composition." Alex Gilvarry, indicating in a review by Slug Magazine, says, "Loud Harp comes as a breath of fresh air...The message here might be lost on some, but the power and feeling behind the delivery is enough to make anyone emotional."

Awards and accolades
The album was No. 1 on the Worship Leader'''s Top 5 Community Funded and Indie Releases of 2014 list.

The song, "Nearness of You", was No. 10 on the Worship Leader'''s Top 20 Songs of 2014 list.

Track listing

Chart performance

References

2014 albums